Frank the Bastard is a 2013 American thriller film written and directed by Brad Coley and starring Rachel Miner and Andy Comeau.

Cast
Rachel Miner as Clair
William Sadler as Cyrus Gast
Wendy Vanden Heuvel as Alice
Andy Comeau as Frank
Shamika Cotton as Isolda
Ellen Albertini Dow as Dora
Chris Sarandon as Tristan Pace

Reception
The film has an 11% rating on Rotten Tomatoes.

References

External links
 
 

American thriller films
2013 thriller films
2013 films
2010s English-language films
2010s American films